is a Japanese voice actor affiliated with Haikyō. He was born in Saitama and grew up in Okinawa.

Biography 
Kentaro has 2 younger brothers. He lived in Saitama before entering elementary school, then moved to Central Okinawa and lived there until he was 19-years-old.

After graduating from Sogo Gakuen Human Academy in 2014, he entered the Haikyo Voice acting Studio. In 2015, he started working at  Tokyo Actor's Consumer's Cooperative Society.

He has certificate for PADI Open Diver license. He played soccer from elementary school to junior high school.

Filmography

TV Anime 
2015
 Mobile Suit Gundam: Iron-Blooded Orphans (2015-2016: Aston Altland, Dios Minco, Karta guards, Makanai Guard)

2016
 Please Tell Me! Galko-chan (Hakase)
 Time Bokan 24 (Momotaro)
 Alderamin on the Sky (Iriq Bauza)
 BBK/BRNK (Angus Wun)

2017
 Tsuki ga Kirei (Tsubasa Kaneko)
 Tsuredure Children (Haruhiko Takase)
 Knight's & Magic (Stephen)
 Idol Master Side M (Hideo Akuno)

2018
 Record of Grancrest War (Theo Cornaro)
 Hinomaru Sumo (Yuma Gojo)
 Idolmaster SideM: Riyū Atte Mini! (Hideo Akuno)

2020
 number24 (Makoto Someya)
 The Millionaire Detective Balance: Unlimited (Shinnosuke Kamei)
 A3! (Omi Fushimi)
 The God of High School (Han Daewi)
 Get Up! Get Live! #Gera Gera (Kazuma Komae)
 Ikebukuro West Gate Park (Makoto Majima)
 Noblesse (Rajak Kertia)
 Drifting Dragon (Gaga) 

2021
 Yokai Gakuen Y: N Tono Sougū (Oujirou Susano)
 Tsukipro the Animation 2 (Hiro Yuzuki)

2022
 Tribe Nine (Hyakutarō Senju)
 Aoashi (Ryūichi Takeshima)
 Lucifer and the Biscuit Hammer (Dance Dark)
 Welcome to Demon School! Iruma-kun Season 3 (Ichiro Androalphus)

2023
 The Tale of the Outcasts (Takenami)

Original Video Animation (OVA) 

 Yarichin Bitch Club (2018, Jimmy)

Web Animation 
2020
 Hallelujah -Unmei no Sentaku (Syura)
 Yoshimaho (Jun)

Digital Comic 

 dTV Ousama no Viking (2018, Warai neko)
 Aniki no Tomodachi (2021, Ken Kakimoto)

Video Games 
2015
 Idol Master Side M (Hideo Akuno)

2016
 Soul Worker (Jite)
 Ikemen Revolution: Love and Magic in Wonderland (Zero)
 For Whom the Alchemist Exist (Raegen, Nasario)
 Yūkyu no Tia Blade: Lost Chronicle (Fou)

2017
 A3!   (Omi Fushimi）
 Quiz RPG Mahotukai to Kuroneko no Wiz *Elrow Guiro)
 Yukyu no Tia Blade: Fragments of Memory (Fou)
 Akane Sasu Sekai de Kimi to Utau (Issa Kobayashi)
 Idol Master SideM LIVE ON ST@GE! (Hideo Akuno)

2018
 Shin Megami Tensei: Liberation Dx2 (Vagit Chukhovf)
 Genei Monogatari  (Jiang Wei, Gan Ning, Xu Chu)）
 Summer Pockets (Mitani Ryoichi)ref></ref>）
 Record of Grancest (Theo Cornero)）
 Record of Grancest: Senran no Shijuso (Theo Cornero)
 Idol Fantasy (Soma Kanon)
 Shinen Resist (Frost)）

2019
 Op8 (Itsuki Reizei)
 Choice×Darling (Subaru Haizaki)
 Caravan Stories (Felix)
 Generation Crossrays (Aston Altland)
 Hoshinari Echoes (Tachibana Ichijo)）

2020
 Grimms Notes (Esel)
 Summer Pockets Reflection Blue (Ryoichi Mitani)）
 Show By Rock!! Fes A Live (Gashi Gashi)
 Touken Ranbu (Chiganemaru)
 Dotokoi (Masamune Nikaidou)
 Hero Cantare (Han Daewi)

2021
 Idol Master Pops Link ( Hideo Akuno)
 Isekai ni Tensei Shitara Densetsu no Yuusha (Uke) Deshita (Leon)
 La Corda d'Oro: Starlight Orchestra(Minami Otome)
 Yumeokoku to Nemureru 100nin no Oujisama (Subaru)

Drama CD 

 Mobile Suit Gundam: Iron-Blooded Orphans EPISODE DRAMA 1 (2017, Aston Altland)
 Koi Suru Sharehoues 5: Which do You Choose? (2018, Koji Aoyama)）
 Summer Pockets (2018, Mitani Ryoichi）
 Kiss de Kimi wo Tokasumade Ikemen Futari ni Semararete Office (2019,Mamoru Ijūin )
 Otogi no Uta: Chronicle (2019, Inutake)
 Momotroop Otogi no Uta: Chronicle Liberty (2019)
 Dryadroid (2019, Blan)）
 Get Up! Get Live! Steam Rising (2019, Kazuma Komae)
 Spy Hyakkaten (2020 Yukio Igari)

BLCD 

 Yarichin Bitch Club series (2017–2019, Jimmy)
 Yarichin Bitch Club
 Yarichin Bitch Club 2
 Yarichin Bitch Club 3
 Yarichin Bitch Club 4
 Yome ni Konaika (Shujiro Sonozaki)

2018
 Watashi no Shiranai Karera no Himitu 2 (Sota Nishiyama)
 Sayonara alpha (Ogihara Ototo )

2019
 No Color Baby (Daichi Kirijima)
 Boai Friendship (Kotaro Akiyama)
 Kimi to Boku no Sekai no Hotori series (Sosuke Sena)
 Phrase2 Mayoi Koi Valentine
 Phrase3 Kataomoi Sotsugyo
 Okamikun wa Kowakunai (2019–2020, Shiro Hoezaki)
 Thoroughbred wa Nabikanai
 Sahara no Kurohashi (2019-2020, Roki)
 Sahara no Kurohashi 2 Side Alkil
 Kirai janai kedo Ningen tte Kowai! (Yoritomo Isomata)
 Lost Virgin (Matusaka Keishi)
 Karera no Koi no Yukue wo Tada Hitasura ni Mimamoru CD: Danshi Kokosei Hajimete no series (2019-2021, Ichiya Aikawa)
 Amaetagari King to Sewayaki Jack
 4th After Disc: Just You!
 Asami Kun wa Gachi Koi Janai (Masatoki Sahashi)

2020
 A ga Awo Daku Hoho (Ryuka Kitaumi)
 Goriyo wa Keikakuteki ni (Makoto Kanezo)
 Cupid ni Rakurai Tuigeki (Kazuaki)
 Love me My Dog (Aiichiro Enomoto)
 Abarenbo Honey(Moriyama Takuma, Kuma)）
 Kirai de Isate (2020-2021, Murasame)
 Kirai de Isate 2

2021
 Yamashi Koi no Hajimekata (Kentaro Araki)）
 Aisaregatari no Surface (Onoda)
 Reverse (Shiro Washinuma)
 H wa Shu 7 Kibo desu! (Iori Kurose)）
 Sandrion no Kuroi Kawagutu (Ayumu Haibara)
 Tondemonai Ore no A ( Rin Inoshishiza)
 Sukini Shitai yo (Masumi)

Dubbing

Live-Action 

 The Expanding Universe of Ashley Garcia (2020, Stick)
 Euphoria (2021,Ethan)

Animation 

 Abominable (2020, Jin)

Discography

Character Songs

Other Related Songs

References

External links 
 Tokyo Actor's Consumer's Cooperative Society Official Profile (Japanese)

Male voice actors from Okinawa Prefecture
Japanese male video game actors
Japanese male voice actors
Living people
1994 births